The 1997 Wills Golden Jubilee Tournament (also known as the Wills Quadrangular Tournament) was a quadrangular one-day cricket competition held in November, 1997 in Pakistan to mark that country's 50th anniversary of independence. It featured the national cricket teams of Sri Lanka, South Africa, West Indies and the hosts Pakistan. All the matches were held at the Gaddafi Stadium in Lahore. Defeating Sri Lanka in the final, South Africa won its first tournament in the Indian subcontinent in its seventh attempt.

Background
Following the model of the 1997 Pepsi Independence Cup that celebrated India's 50th anniversary of independence, the Wills Golden Jubilee Tournament sought to mark the 50 years of Pakistan's independence. During the final of the tournament, the Pakistan Cricket Board honoured all the living Test cricket captains of Pakistan by parading them in horse-drawn carriages and presenting them with gold medals. The only Pakistan captain not to attend was Imran Khan, who excused himself due to political commitments. Sri Lanka, the winners of the 1996 Cricket World Cup and the 1997 Asia Cup, were the leading favourites along with the dominant South African team. The matches were affected by night-time heavy dew and insects on the field. The white-coloured cricket ball frequently became soggy and discoloured. These conditions gave the team that batted second a clear advantage.

Squads

Points Table

Source:ESPN Cricinfo

Matches

Final

Records and awards
South Africa's Lance Klusener bagged the player of the series award, having top-scored in the tournament with 215 runs and taken 8 wickets as well.

References

External links
 Tournament home at ESPNcricinfo
 

Wills Golden Jubilee Tournament
International cricket competitions from 1997–98 to 2000
Cricket